Esmont is a census-designated place (CDP) in Albemarle County, Virginia, United States. The population as of the 2020 Census was 491. 

Esmont, Guthrie Hall, and Mountain Grove are listed the National Register of Historic Places.

History

The town was built from land purchased from the former Esmont plantation estate, built by Dr. Charles Cocke, and for which the town was named. Having rich soil, the town has historically been a farming community with a predominantly African American population. The area has been populated since the eighteenth century, though it did not acquire a post office until the later nineteenth century.
Slate quarrying began near Esmont in 1883, and by the mid 1920s, the 6000 acre alwas the nation's largest soapstone producer. The quarry operation stopped in the 1960s due to environmental concerns. At its peak, Esmont had a depot for the Chesapeake and Ohio Railroad, 3 stores, St. Steven's Episcopal Church (built of wood in 1914 and still in operation) and a bank (now converted into a post office). It has recently been the focus of an oral history project by the Carter Woodson institute.

New Hope Baptist is a historically Black church in Esmont.  In 1974, the pastor was Rev. H.J. Scruggs, Jr.

In 1974, Esmont also boasted a Greencroft Garden Club.

References

Virginia Trend Report 2: State and Complete Places (Sub-state 2010 Census Data)

Unincorporated communities in Virginia
Census-designated places in Albemarle County, Virginia
Census-designated places in Virginia